The women's team portable apparatus competition at the 1952 Summer Olympics was held at Messuhalli, Exhibition Hall II on 24 July. It was the first appearance of the event, which would only be held again in 1956.

Competition format

The gymnastics format continued to use the aggregation format. Each nation entered a team of eight gymnasts. The team apparatus event was one of the components of the team all-around event. No separate finals were contested. For the team portable apparatus, eight judges gave scores between 0 and 10, the top two and bottom two scores were discarded, and the remaining four scores were summed and multiplied by 2. Thus, team apparatus scores ranged from 0 to 80.

Results

References

Women's team portable apparatus
1952
Women's events at the 1952 Summer Olympics